The Glazert Water is a tributary of the River Kelvin in East Dunbartonshire, Scotland.

References

External links

Rivers of East Dunbartonshire
Tributaries of the River Kelvin